Güngörmüş (literally "has seen days," meaning "worldly" or "experienced") is a Turkish place name that may refer to the following places in Turkey:

 Güngörmüş, Gerger, a village in the district of Gerger, Adıyaman Province
 Güngörmüş, Taşova, a village in the district of Taşova, Amasya Province